Timothy M. McGuire (born September 3, 1953) is an American football coach.  He served as the head coach at Morningside College from 1981 to 1982 and at Indiana State University from 1998 to 2004.

Early life and college playing career
McGuire was born in Omaha, Nebraska. McGuire graduated from Creighton Preparatory School in 1971. From the 1971 to 1974 seasons, McGuire was an offensive guard for the Nebraska Cornhuskers football team at the University of Nebraska–Lincoln. On Nebraska's varsity team, McGuire played under coach Bob Devaney in 1972 and under Tom Osborne in 1973 and 1974. McGuire was also part of Nebraska teams that won the 1973 Orange Bowl, 1974 Cotton Bowl Classic (for the 1973 season), and 1974 Sugar Bowl (for the 1974 season). McGuire earned his bachelor's degree in mathematics from the College of Arts and Sciences at Nebraska–Lincoln in 1975.

Coaching career
After graduating from Nebraska–Lincoln, McGuire returned to Omaha in 1975 to become a math teacher and head football coach at Archbishop Ryan High School. McGuire took the job after learning that the previous coach at Ryan resigned one week before the season began. In 1977, McGuire became an assistant coach and also a math teacher at Millard High School. From 1978 to 1980, McGuire was a defensive graduate assistant at the University of Nebraska–Omaha for the Nebraska–Omaha Mavericks football team and graduated from Nebraska–Omaha with a master's in physical education.

From 1981 to 1982, McGuire was the head football coach Morningside College in Sioux City, Iowa. His coaching record at Morningside was 7–15.

After leaving Morningside, McGuire was defensive coordinator at Indiana State in 1983. From 1984 to 1985, McGuire was linebackers coach at Kansas State. From 1986 to 1990, McGuire was defensive coordinator at Northern Illinois.  In 1991, he was inside linebackers coach at Navy under George Chaump. In 1992, McGuire became defensive coordinator for Navy's sprint football team that went 7–0 and made the East Lightweight Football Championship.

McGuire returned to Indiana State in 1993 to join the staff of Dennis Raetz as defensive coordinator and served in that position for five seasons. In 1998, McGuire succeeded Raetz as head coach and was head coach until 2004. In 2005, McGuire was defensive coordinator at Division III St. Norbert. Then in 2006, McGuire joined Tony Samuel's staff at Southeast Missouri State as defensive coordinator. Following the 2010 season in which Southeast Missouri State finished 9–3 and made the playoffs, McGuire was promoted to assistant head coach and offensive coordinator. McGuire left Southeast Missouri State after the 2013 season, after Samuel was fired.

In 2014, McGuire joined David Hutchison's staff at the Division II Glenville State as defensive backs coach.

Head coaching record

References

1953 births
Living people
American football offensive guards
Culver–Stockton Wildcats football coaches
Glenville State Pioneers football coaches
Indiana State Sycamores football coaches
Kansas State Wildcats football coaches
Morningside Mustangs football coaches
Navy Midshipmen football coaches
Nebraska Cornhuskers football players
Nebraska–Omaha Mavericks football coaches
Northern Illinois Huskies football coaches
Southeast Missouri State Redhawks football coaches
St. Norbert Green Knights football coaches
High school football coaches in Nebraska
University of Nebraska Omaha alumni
Sportspeople from Omaha, Nebraska
Players of American football from Nebraska